Xavier Reckinger (born 20 December 1983) is a Belgian international field hockey player and coach of the Germany women's national field hockey team.

He played for Braxgata in Boom and is a defender. Before he played with the KHC Dragons. At the 2012 Summer Olympics, with the national team, he finished fifth in the men's tournament. Reckinger became European vice-champion with Belgium at the 2013 European Championship on home ground in Boom.

In January 2015 Xavier Reckinger was added to the coaching staff of the Red panthers. He has coached many players at club level that have made the national teams such as Felix Denayer, Jeffrey Thijs, Barbara Nelen, Aline Fobe, Judith Vandermeiren, Emilie Sinia, who all made the Olympics too.

Reckinger is a Master in Trade Sciences (Lessius Hogeschool). He runs an own consultancy enterprise.

References

External links
 

Living people
1983 births
Belgian male field hockey players
2002 Men's Hockey World Cup players
Field hockey players at the 2008 Summer Olympics
Field hockey players at the 2012 Summer Olympics
2014 Men's Hockey World Cup players
Olympic field hockey players of Belgium
Male field hockey defenders
Field hockey players from Brussels
Oranje Zwart players
KHC Dragons players
Men's Belgian Hockey League players
Men's Hoofdklasse Hockey players